Rebecca Mans Mitchell (born April 22, 1981) is an American epidemiologist, veterinarian, and politician, who serves as a member of Georgia House of Representatives for District 106.

Early life
Mitchell grew up in Skaneateles (town), New York. She earned a DVM from New York State College of Veterinary Medicine at Cornell University in 2011, a PdD in Comparative Medical Sciences, in 2011, and an undergraduate degree in biology from Harvard College. For her unserviceable thesis, she researched the mechanics of growing animals.

References

External links 
 Rebecca Mitchell at ballotpedia.org

Democratic Party members of the Georgia House of Representatives
21st-century American politicians
Living people
21st-century American women politicians
Women state legislators in Georgia (U.S. state)
1981 births
Cornell University College of Veterinary Medicine alumni
Harvard College alumni
People from Skaneateles, New York